The following are the national records in Olympic weightlifting in Chile. Records are maintained in each weight class for the snatch lift, clean and jerk lift, and the total for both lifts by the Federacion Chilena Levantamiento de Pesas (FECHIPE).

Current records

Men

Women

Historical records

Men (1998–2018)

Women (1998–2018)

References

External links
FECHIPE web site
Chilean records
Chilean historical records

Chile
records
Olympic weightlifting
weightlifting